Jean Kent (born Joan Mildred Field; 29 June 1921 − 30 November 2013) was an English film and television actress.

Biography
Born Joan Mildred Field (sometimes incorrectly cited as Summerfield) in Brixton, London in 1921, the only child of variety performers Norman Field (né Summerfield) and Nina Norre ( Mildred Noaks), whose marriage was registered in 1925, according to the General Register Index of England and Wales.

Kent started her theatrical career at age 10 in 1931 as a dancer. She used the stage name Jean Carr when she appeared as a chorus girl in the Windmill Theatre in London from which she was fired by Vivian Van Damm.

Gainsborough Pictures
She signed to Gainsborough Pictures during the Second World War. Kent had small roles in It's That Man Again (1943), Miss London Ltd. (1943) and Warn That Man (1944). Kent had a good role in Two Thousand Women (1944), playing a stripper who is interned by the Germans. She was a Pacific Islander in Bees in Paradise (1944) with Arthur Askey and was the ingenue in a Tommy Trinder musical Champagne Charlie (1944).

The turning point in her career came when she was given a dramatic part in the Gainsborough melodrama film Fanny by Gaslight (1944). She played a part turned down by Margaret Lockwood, that of the childhood friend of the character played by Phyllis Calvert, who becomes the mistress of James Mason. The movie, also starring Stewart Granger, was a box-office success in Britain and established Kent as Gainsborough's back up to Margaret Lockwood.

Kent played another sexually aggressive young woman in Madonna of the Seven Moons (1945) with Calvert and Granger. It was a big hit. Rank borrowed her to support Rex Harrison in The Rake's Progress (1945) then back at Gainsborough she was in Waterloo Road (1945) with John Mills and Granger.

Stardom
Kent shared top billing with Granger in Caravan (1946), playing a gypsy girl in another melodrama. It was a big hit and Kent was given a new contract. Granger and Kent were reunited in The Magic Bow (1946), with Kent again taking a part originally meant for Margaret Lockwood.

"There was a pecking order at Gainsborough," said Kent later. "First Margaret, then Pat, then Phyllis, then me. I was the odds-and-sods girl. I used to mop up the parts that other people didn't want."

After a support role in Carnival (1946) with Michael Wilding, Kent was the female lead in The Man Within (1947), a costume adventure from a novel by Graham Greene. Kent had a good part in The Loves of Joanna Godden (1947) and was given a star role in Good-Time Girl (1948), a melodrama about a girl who goes off the rails. Kent was top billed as one of several names in Bond Street (1948) and was the female lead in a thriller Sleeping Car to Trieste (1948), playing a spy.

Kent had her best chance yet playing the lead in a musical Trottie True (1949) which became her favourite film. She made a comedy in Italy, Her Favourite Husband (1950) and appeared opposite Dirk Bogarde in The Woman in Question (1950). In 1950, Kent was voted the 9th biggest British star in Britain. The following year she was 8th. Kent starred in the melodrama The Reluctant Widow (1951) then had a good role as the wife in The Browning Version (1951).

Kent was in a thriller The Lost Hours (1952) with American actor Mark Stevens and Before I Wake (1955). She appeared in Arthur Watkyn's historical play The Moonraker in 1952 and in 1953 was in a play Uncertain Joy. That year she appeared on a TV play with Michael Craig who said she "was on the wane after a successful career as a film star. She didn't like slumming it in television at all and was very grand and one scary lady."

In 1954, Kent fell ill while touring in a stage production of The Deep Blue Sea in South Africa.

Later career
Kent's film appearances grew less frequent from the mid-1950s onward. She had support roles in The Prince and the Showgirl (1957) and Bonjour Tristesse (1958) and a good part in the horror film The Haunted Strangler (1959). She was in the comedy Please Turn Over (1959) and the thriller Beyond This Place (1959). She was one of several female stars in Bluebeard's Ten Honeymoons (1960) with George Sanders.

She played Queen Elizabeth I in the historical TV adventure series Sir Francis Drake filmed in 1961–62.

In 1982, she played Jennifer Lamont in the soap opera Crossroads.

Personal life
Kent was married to Austrian actor Josef Ramart from 1946 until his death in 1989, aged 70. They met on the set of Caravan, in which he also appeared. Actor Stewart Granger, a co-star from this film, was the best man at their wedding. Kent and Ramart also both had roles in the film Trottie True.

She was the subject of This Is Your Life in 1974 when she was surprised by Eamonn Andrews at the Strand Theatre. Kent made her last public appearance in June 2011, when she was honoured by the British Film Institute on her 90th birthday. She was a guest at a screening of Caravan at the BFI Southbank.

Death
Kent died in the West Suffolk Hospital, Bury St. Edmunds on 30 November 2013, following a fall at her home in Westhorpe. The coroner recorded a narrative verdict that Kent died from accidental injuries and that cardiac disease may have contributed to a fall.

Filmography

Film

Television

Box office ranking
For a number of years, British film exhibitors voted her among the top ten British stars at the box office via an annual poll in the Motion Picture Herald.
1950 – 9th
1951 – 8th

References

External links
 BBC: Jean Kent at 90
 
 British Pictures Stars
 Photographs of Jean Kent

1921 births
2013 deaths
English television actresses
English film actresses
People from Brixton
Actresses from London
Accidental deaths from falls
People from Westhorpe, Suffolk
20th-century English actresses